The 2001–02 Dallas Stars season was the Stars' 9th season as the Dallas Stars and the 35th overall of the franchise. It was the Stars' first season playing home games at the American Airlines Center, and they went 18–13–6–4 in their new home stadium. However, they did not follow up their success from the previous year, only picking up 90 points for 36 wins against 28 losses for 4th place in the division and 10th in the Conference. They missed the playoffs for the first time since the 1995–96 season.

Offseason

Regular season
December 26, 2001: In a 2-0 shutout over the Dallas Stars, Patrick Roy became the first goalie to win 500 games in a career.

Final standings

Schedule and results

|- align="center" bgcolor="#CCFFCC" 
|1||W||October 5, 2001||4–1 || align="left"|  Nashville Predators (2001–02) ||1–0–0–0 || 
|- align="center" bgcolor="#FFBBBB"
|2||L||October 7, 2001||0–3 || align="left"| @ Carolina Hurricanes (2001–02) ||1–1–0–0 || 
|- align="center" bgcolor="#CCFFCC" 
|3||W||October 9, 2001||2–1 || align="left"|  Los Angeles Kings (2001–02) ||2–1–0–0 || 
|- align="center" bgcolor="#FFBBBB"
|4||L||October 11, 2001||1–4 || align="left"|  Vancouver Canucks (2001–02) ||2–2–0–0 || 
|- align="center" bgcolor="#FF6F6F"
|5||OTL||October 13, 2001||3–4 OT|| align="left"|  Calgary Flames (2001–02) ||2–2–0–1 || 
|- align="center" 
|6||T||October 17, 2001||2–2 OT|| align="left"| @ St. Louis Blues (2001–02) ||2–2–1–1 || 
|- align="center" bgcolor="#CCFFCC" 
|7||W||October 18, 2001||3–1 || align="left"|  Phoenix Coyotes (2001–02) ||3–2–1–1 || 
|- align="center" 
|8||T||October 20, 2001||2–2 OT|| align="left"|  Chicago Blackhawks (2001–02) ||3–2–2–1 || 
|- align="center" bgcolor="#FFBBBB"
|9||L||October 24, 2001||2–3 || align="left"| @ Pittsburgh Penguins (2001–02) ||3–3–2–1 || 
|- align="center" bgcolor="#CCFFCC" 
|10||W||October 26, 2001||5–3 || align="left"| @ Detroit Red Wings (2001–02) ||4–3–2–1 || 
|- align="center" bgcolor="#FF6F6F"
|11||OTL||October 28, 2001||2–3 OT|| align="left"| @ New York Islanders (2001–02) ||4–3–2–2 || 
|- align="center" bgcolor="#FFBBBB"
|12||L||October 29, 2001||2–4 || align="left"| @ New York Rangers (2001–02) ||4–4–2–2 || 
|- align="center" bgcolor="#FF6F6F"
|13||OTL||October 31, 2001||3–4 OT|| align="left"|  Detroit Red Wings (2001–02) ||4–4–2–3 || 
|-

|- align="center" bgcolor="#CCFFCC" 
|14||W||November 2, 2001||3–0 || align="left"|  Nashville Predators (2001–02) ||5–4–2–3 || 
|- align="center" bgcolor="#FFBBBB"
|15||L||November 3, 2001||1–4 || align="left"| @ Nashville Predators (2001–02) ||5–5–2–3 || 
|- align="center" 
|16||T||November 7, 2001||2–2 OT|| align="left"|  San Jose Sharks (2001–02) ||5–5–3–3 || 
|- align="center" bgcolor="#FFBBBB"
|17||L||November 9, 2001||1–5 || align="left"|  Phoenix Coyotes (2001–02) ||5–6–3–3 || 
|- align="center" 
|18||T||November 11, 2001||2–2 OT|| align="left"| @ Mighty Ducks of Anaheim (2001–02) ||5–6–4–3 || 
|- align="center" bgcolor="#CCFFCC" 
|19||W||November 15, 2001||4–3 || align="left"| @ Los Angeles Kings (2001–02) ||6–6–4–3 || 
|- align="center" bgcolor="#CCFFCC" 
|20||W||November 17, 2001||3–2 OT|| align="left"| @ San Jose Sharks (2001–02) ||7–6–4–3 || 
|- align="center" bgcolor="#FFBBBB"
|21||L||November 19, 2001||2–3 || align="left"|  New York Islanders (2001–02) ||7–7–4–3 || 
|- align="center" 
|22||T||November 21, 2001||4–4 OT|| align="left"|  Carolina Hurricanes (2001–02) ||7–7–5–3 || 
|- align="center" 
|23||T||November 23, 2001||3–3 OT|| align="left"|  Philadelphia Flyers (2001–02) ||7–7–6–3 || 
|- align="center" bgcolor="#CCFFCC" 
|24||W||November 25, 2001||4–3 || align="left"| @ Minnesota Wild (2001–02) ||8–7–6–3 || 
|- align="center" bgcolor="#CCFFCC" 
|25||W||November 29, 2001||3–0 || align="left"| @ Calgary Flames (2001–02) ||9–7–6–3 || 
|-

|- align="center" bgcolor="#CCFFCC" 
|26||W||December 1, 2001||6–4 || align="left"| @ Edmonton Oilers (2001–02) ||10–7–6–3 || 
|- align="center" bgcolor="#CCFFCC" 
|27||W||December 2, 2001||4–2 || align="left"| @ Vancouver Canucks (2001–02) ||11–7–6–3 || 
|- align="center" bgcolor="#FFBBBB"
|28||L||December 5, 2001||3–6 || align="left"|  Ottawa Senators (2001–02) ||11–8–6–3 || 
|- align="center" bgcolor="#CCFFCC" 
|29||W||December 7, 2001||5–0 || align="left"|  Edmonton Oilers (2001–02) ||12–8–6–3 || 
|- align="center" bgcolor="#CCFFCC" 
|30||W||December 12, 2001||4–3 || align="left"|  Buffalo Sabres (2001–02) ||13–8–6–3 || 
|- align="center" bgcolor="#FFBBBB"
|31||L||December 14, 2001||3–4 || align="left"|  Calgary Flames (2001–02) ||13–9–6–3 || 
|- align="center" bgcolor="#CCFFCC" 
|32||W||December 15, 2001||6–2 || align="left"| @ Phoenix Coyotes (2001–02) ||14–9–6–3 || 
|- align="center" bgcolor="#FFBBBB"
|33||L||December 17, 2001||1–4 || align="left"|  San Jose Sharks (2001–02) ||14–10–6–3 || 
|- align="center" bgcolor="#FFBBBB"
|34||L||December 20, 2001||1–2 || align="left"| @ Philadelphia Flyers (2001–02) ||14–11–6–3 || 
|- align="center" bgcolor="#CCFFCC" 
|35||W||December 22, 2001||4–2 || align="left"| @ Columbus Blue Jackets (2001–02) ||15–11–6–3 || 
|- align="center" bgcolor="#CCFFCC" 
|36||W||December 23, 2001||4–1 || align="left"| @ Atlanta Thrashers (2001–02) ||16–11–6–3 || 
|- align="center" bgcolor="#FFBBBB"
|37||L||December 26, 2001||0–2 || align="left"|  Colorado Avalanche (2001–02) ||16–12–6–3 || 
|- align="center" bgcolor="#FF6F6F"
|38||OTL||December 28, 2001||2–3 OT|| align="left"|  Washington Capitals (2001–02) ||16–12–6–4 || 
|- align="center" bgcolor="#CCFFCC" 
|39||W||December 31, 2001||2–1 || align="left"|  Boston Bruins (2001–02) ||17–12–6–4 || 
|-

|- align="center" bgcolor="#CCFFCC" 
|40||W||January 2, 2002||2–1 || align="left"|  Atlanta Thrashers (2001–02) ||18–12–6–4 || 
|- align="center" bgcolor="#FFBBBB"
|41||L||January 5, 2002||2–5 || align="left"| @ St. Louis Blues (2001–02) ||18–13–6–4 || 
|- align="center" bgcolor="#CCFFCC" 
|42||W||January 8, 2002||2–1 || align="left"| @ Tampa Bay Lightning (2001–02) ||19–13–6–4 || 
|- align="center" bgcolor="#CCFFCC" 
|43||W||January 9, 2002||3–2 || align="left"| @ Florida Panthers (2001–02) ||20–13–6–4 || 
|- align="center" bgcolor="#FFBBBB"
|44||L||January 12, 2002||2–5 || align="left"| @ Detroit Red Wings (2001–02) ||20–14–6–4 || 
|- align="center" bgcolor="#CCFFCC" 
|45||W||January 13, 2002||3–1 || align="left"| @ Minnesota Wild (2001–02) ||21–14–6–4 || 
|- align="center" bgcolor="#CCFFCC" 
|46||W||January 16, 2002||3–2 || align="left"|  Detroit Red Wings (2001–02) ||22–14–6–4 || 
|- align="center" bgcolor="#FFBBBB"
|47||L||January 18, 2002||2–3 || align="left"|  Florida Panthers (2001–02) ||22–15–6–4 || 
|- align="center" bgcolor="#FFBBBB"
|48||L||January 20, 2002||2–3 || align="left"| @ Chicago Blackhawks (2001–02) ||22–16–6–4 || 
|- align="center" bgcolor="#CCFFCC" 
|49||W||January 21, 2002||5–3 || align="left"| @ Columbus Blue Jackets (2001–02) ||23–16–6–4 || 
|- align="center" bgcolor="#FFBBBB"
|50||L||January 23, 2002||2–4 || align="left"|  Vancouver Canucks (2001–02) ||23–17–6–4 || 
|- align="center" bgcolor="#FFBBBB"
|51||L||January 25, 2002||1–6 || align="left"|  Mighty Ducks of Anaheim (2001–02) ||23–18–6–4 || 
|- align="center" bgcolor="#CCFFCC" 
|52||W||January 28, 2002||4–2 || align="left"|  Columbus Blue Jackets (2001–02) ||24–18–6–4 || 
|-

|- align="center" bgcolor="#FFBBBB"
|53||L||February 6, 2002||1–2 || align="left"| @ Nashville Predators (2001–02) ||24–19–6–4 || 
|- align="center" 
|54||T||February 8, 2002||1–1 OT|| align="left"|  Edmonton Oilers (2001–02) ||24–19–7–4 || 
|- align="center" bgcolor="#CCFFCC" 
|55||W||February 10, 2002||5–1 || align="left"| @ Mighty Ducks of Anaheim (2001–02) ||25–19–7–4 || 
|- align="center" bgcolor="#FFBBBB"
|56||L||February 11, 2002||1–2 || align="left"| @ Los Angeles Kings (2001–02) ||25–20–7–4 || 
|- align="center" bgcolor="#CCFFCC" 
|57||W||February 13, 2002||4–2 || align="left"|  New York Rangers (2001–02) ||26–20–7–4 || 
|- align="center" bgcolor="#FFBBBB"
|58||L||February 26, 2002||1–5 || align="left"| @ Phoenix Coyotes (2001–02) ||26–21–7–4 || 
|- align="center" bgcolor="#CCFFCC" 
|59||W||February 28, 2002||4–3 OT|| align="left"| @ Vancouver Canucks (2001–02) ||27–21–7–4 || 
|-

|- align="center" bgcolor="#CCFFCC" 
|60||W||March 2, 2002||2–1 || align="left"| @ Colorado Avalanche (2001–02) ||28–21–7–4 || 
|- align="center" bgcolor="#CCFFCC" 
|61||W||March 3, 2002||4–1 || align="left"|  San Jose Sharks (2001–02) ||29–21–7–4 || 
|- align="center" bgcolor="#CCFFCC" 
|62||W||March 6, 2002||3–2 OT|| align="left"|  Los Angeles Kings (2001–02) ||30–21–7–4 || 
|- align="center" bgcolor="#FFBBBB"
|63||L||March 8, 2002||3–5 || align="left"|  Minnesota Wild (2001–02) ||30–22–7–4 || 
|- align="center" bgcolor="#FFBBBB"
|64||L||March 10, 2002||0–3 || align="left"|  New Jersey Devils (2001–02) ||30–23–7–4 || 
|- align="center" bgcolor="#CCFFCC" 
|65||W||March 12, 2002||5–2 || align="left"| @ Washington Capitals (2001–02) ||31–23–7–4 || 
|- align="center" 
|66||T||March 14, 2002||3–3 OT|| align="left"| @ Montreal Canadiens (2001–02) ||31–23–8–4 || 
|- align="center" 
|67||T||March 16, 2002||5–5 OT|| align="left"| @ Toronto Maple Leafs (2001–02) ||31–23–9–4 || 
|- align="center" 
|68||T||March 18, 2002||2–2 OT|| align="left"| @ Chicago Blackhawks (2001–02) ||31–23–10–4 || 
|- align="center" bgcolor="#CCFFCC" 
|69||W||March 20, 2002||3–2 || align="left"|  St. Louis Blues (2001–02) ||32–23–10–4 || 
|- align="center" bgcolor="#CCFFCC" 
|70||W||March 22, 2002||4–3 || align="left"|  Phoenix Coyotes (2001–02) ||33–23–10–4 || 
|- align="center" bgcolor="#FFBBBB"
|71||L||March 24, 2002||1–2 || align="left"|  Mighty Ducks of Anaheim (2001–02) ||33–24–10–4 || 
|- align="center" bgcolor="#FFBBBB"
|72||L||March 26, 2002||2–3 || align="left"| @ San Jose Sharks (2001–02) ||33–25–10–4 || 
|- align="center" 
|73||T||March 28, 2002||2–2 OT|| align="left"| @ Calgary Flames (2001–02) ||33–25–11–4 || 
|- align="center" bgcolor="#FFBBBB"
|74||L||March 30, 2002||1–3 || align="left"| @ Edmonton Oilers (2001–02) ||33–26–11–4 || 
|-

|- align="center" bgcolor="#CCFFCC" 
|75||W||April 1, 2002||3–1 || align="left"|  Columbus Blue Jackets (2001–02) ||34–26–11–4 || 
|- align="center" bgcolor="#FF6F6F"
|76||OTL||April 3, 2002||1–2 OT|| align="left"|  St. Louis Blues (2001–02) ||34–26–11–5 || 
|- align="center" bgcolor="#CCFFCC" 
|77||W||April 5, 2002||3–1 || align="left"|  Colorado Avalanche (2001–02) ||35–26–11–5 || 
|- align="center" bgcolor="#FFBBBB"
|78||L||April 7, 2002||1–4 || align="left"| @ Mighty Ducks of Anaheim (2001–02) ||35–27–11–5 || 
|- align="center" bgcolor="#FFBBBB"
|79||L||April 8, 2002||0–3 || align="left"| @ Los Angeles Kings (2001–02) ||35–28–11–5 || 
|- align="center" 
|80||T||April 10, 2002||4–4 OT|| align="left"|  Minnesota Wild (2001–02) ||35–28–12–5 || 
|- align="center" bgcolor="#CCFFCC" 
|81||W||April 12, 2002||3–1 || align="left"|  Chicago Blackhawks (2001–02) ||36–28–12–5 || 
|- align="center" 
|82||T||April 14, 2002||2–2 OT|| align="left"| @ Colorado Avalanche (2001–02) ||36–28–13–5 || 
|-

|-
| Legend:

Player statistics

Scoring
 Position abbreviations: C = Center; D = Defense; G = Goaltender; LW = Left Wing; RW = Right Wing
  = Joined team via a transaction (e.g., trade, waivers, signing) during the season. Stats reflect time with the Stars only.
  = Left team via a transaction (e.g., trade, waivers, release) during the season. Stats reflect time with the Stars only.

Goaltending

Awards and records

Transactions
The Stars were involved in the following transactions from June 10, 2001, the day after the deciding game of the 2001 Stanley Cup Finals, through June 13, 2002, the day of the deciding game of the 2002 Stanley Cup Finals.

Trades

Players acquired

Players lost

Signings

Draft picks
Dallas's draft picks at the 2001 NHL Entry Draft held at the National Car Rental Center in Sunrise, Florida.

See also
2001–02 NHL season

Notes

References

Dall
Dall
Dallas Stars seasons